The suffix -ane in organic chemistry forms the names of organic compounds where the -C-C- group has been attributed the highest priority according to the rules of organic nomenclature. Such organic compounds are called alkanes. They are saturated hydrocarbons. 

The names of the saturated hydrides of non-metals end with the suffix  -ane: the hydrides of silicon are called silanes SiH4; the hydrides of boron are boranes B2H6. 

The final "-e" is dropped before a suffix that starts with a vowel, e.g. "propanol".

Alternatively, -ane may be used for a mononuclear hydride of an element. For instance, methane for CH4 and oxidane for H2O (water). 
For the etymology, see Alkane.

See also 
 IUPAC nomenclature of organic chemistry

References 

ane
English suffixes